The Dance of Life or Life's Dance is an 1899– expressionist painting by Edvard Munch, now in the National Museum of Art in Norway. The arch of life spans from white young virgin in white over the pair with red wife to an old widow in black. 

The painting was an important work in Munch's project The Frieze of Life. In creating the painting, Munch was allegedly inspired by the Helge Rode play Dansen gaar, of which Munch kept a copy in his personal library. This painting clearly reflects Munch's ambivalence towards the women in his life. 

Olaf Schou purchased the painting in Oslo in 1910, immediately presenting it to the National Gallery.

References

Sources
http://www.edvard-munch.com/

1899 paintings
1900 paintings
Dance in art
Paintings by Edvard Munch
Paintings in the collection of the National Gallery (Norway)